I Lo-fen (born 26 October 1964, in Taipei) is a Taiwanese scholar and writer. She received her Chinese Literature Ph.D. from National Taiwan University. She has been an associate professor in the Division of Chinese in Nanyang Technological University’s School of Humanities and Social Sciences since July 2006, and was the Head of the Division (2014-2016). She had formerly committed in institutes like the National Taiwan University, Tamkang University, Fu Jen Catholic University, and the Institute of Chinese Literature and Philosophy at Academia Sinica. In addition, she was also a visiting professor at Stanford University in the United States and East Asian Institute at Sungkyunkwan University, South Korea. Her research expertise lies in Text and Image Studies, Su Shi studies, East Asian literature and intercultural exchanges in Classical Chinese, and Singapore literature, history, and arts studies. She is also a board member of the China Su Shi Studies Society, and an international board member of the Korea Society of East Asian Comparative Literature. She is the Founder and Honorary President of the "Text and Image Studies Society"(文图学会) that was official registered in Singapore on 18 December 2017. By integrating the history of Chinese literature and arts, she has accomplished a series of researches on poems in paintings and poetic imagery. She then proposed the idea of the “Text and Image Studies”(文图学) and focused on the relations, comparison and intertextuality between poems and paintings. From there, she has established her literary theory in arts creation and culture of aesthetics. She is also a column writer of Singapore Lianhe Zaobao (2007-), and she hosts podcast "Lofen says".

Awards
Koh Boon Hwee Scholars Award of Nanyang Technological University (2019)
Singapore National Arts Council Publication Award (2015)
Academia Sinica Research Award for Junior Research Investigators (2004)
Wu Da-You Foundation Award (2004)
Sichuan Provincial Government Exceptional Academic Works Award (Co-author of The History of Su Shi Studies (苏轼研究史)) (2003)
Taiwan National Science Council Research Grant Award (1996-2002, award was discontinued after 2002)
Taiwan Government Information Office Best Book Award (Co-editor of Van Gogh, O! Van Gogh (梵谷噢！梵谷！) with Ho Kung-shang, 1998)
Hsueh Ming Min Academic Works Award, Outstanding (1989, 1994)
Modern Poetry Writing Award, Department of Chinese Studies, National Taiwan University   (“The Night of Hua Xi Street”(华西街之夜)) (1984)

Works

Academic Monograph 

 《春光秋波：看見文圖學》(南京：南京大學出版社，2020)

(Through the Ages: Encountering Text and Image Studies, Nanjing University Press, 2020)

 《陪你去看蘇東坡》(台北：有鹿文化，2020)

(Bringing You Through the Journey of Su Dongpo, Route Culture, 2020)

 《書藝東坡》(上海：上海古籍出版社，2019)

(The Art of Su Dongpo's Calligraphy, Shanghai Chinese Classics Publishing House, 2019)

 《東張西望：文圖學與亞洲視界》(新加坡：八方文化創作室，2019)

(Observing the Synergy: Text and Image Studies and Asia Horizon, Singapore: Global Publishing, 2019)
《南洋風華：藝文•廣告•跨界新加坡》（新加坡：八方文化創作室，2016）
(Gorgeous Nanyang: Arts, Advertisements, Crossover Singapore, Singapore: Global Publishing, 2016)
《雲影天光：瀟湘山水之畫意與詩情》（臺北：里仁書局，2013）
(Of Cloud Shadows and Celestial Light: Poems and Paintings of the Landscape of Xiao Xiang, Taipei: Li Ren Shu Ju, 2013)
《藝林探微：繪畫•古物•文學》（上海：華東師範大學出版社，2012）
(Exploration of Art, Shanghai: East China Normal University Press, 2012)
《遊目騁懷：文學與美術的互文與再生》（臺北：里仁書局，2011）
(Intextuality and Citationality in Chinese Literature and Art, Taipei: Li Ren Shu Ju, 2011)
《三絕之美鄭板橋》（臺北：花木蘭出版社，2009）
(The Poetry, Paintings and Calligraphy of Zheng Banqiao, Taipei: Hua Mu Lan Publisher, 2009)
《觀看•敍述•審美：唐宋題畫文學論集》（臺北：中央研究院中國文哲研究所，2004）
(Observation, Description, Appreciation: Studies of Tang-Song Writings on Painting, Taipei: Institute of Chinese Literature and Philosophy, Academia Sinica, 2004)
《赤壁漫遊與西園雅集：蘇軾研究論集》（北京：線裝書局，2001）
(Wandering Under the Red Cliffs and Elegant Gathering in the Western Garden: Studies on Su Shi, Beijing: Xian Zhuang Shu Ju, 2001)
《蘇軾研究史》（與曾棗莊合著）（南京：江蘇教育出版社，2001）（四川省政府優良學術著作獎）
(A History of Su Shi Studies, co-authored with Zeng Zaozhuang, Nanjing: Jiangsu Education Publisher, 2001)
《世變與創化：漢唐、唐宋轉換期之文藝現象》（與劉苑如合編）（臺北：中央研究院中國文哲研究所，2000）
(Historical Transitions and Creativity: Literature and Art in the Han-Tang and Tang-Song Transitions, co-edited with Liu Yuan-ju, Taipei: Institute of Chinese Literature and Philosophy, Academia Sinica, 2000)
《蘇軾題畫文學研究》（臺北：文津出版社，1999）
(Su Shi's Literary Works on Paintings, Taipei: Wen Chin Publisher, 1999)

References

External links 
I, Lo-fen's Academic Blog (衣若芬的学术部落格：华雨思路)
I, Lo-fen's Literature Blog (衣若芬的文学部落格：紅豆书简)
I, Lo-fen's Academia Page (衣若芬的学术著作)

1964 births
Living people
Taiwanese writers
National Taiwan University alumni
Academic staff of Fu Jen Catholic University
Academic staff of Nanyang Technological University